Komuniga is a village in Chernoochene Municipality, in Kardzhali Province, in southern-central Bulgaria. It covers an area of 26.665 square kilometres and as of 2007 it had a population of 1150 people.

Komuniga Island in Graham Land, Antarctica is named after the village.

References

Villages in Kardzhali Province